Vlastimil Opálek (born 7 February 1959 in Trnava - died 5 October 1995) was a Slovak football goalkeeper.

Career
Opálek played as a goalkeeper for FC Spartak Trnava. After retiring from playing, he became a goalkeeping coach for Spartak at age 35.

Personal
Opálek died in a traffic accident in Drnovice at age 36.

References

External links
Biography

1959 births
1995 deaths
Czechoslovak footballers
Slovak footballers
FC Spartak Trnava players
Sportspeople from Trnava
Road incident deaths in the Czech Republic
Association football goalkeepers